Little Blue Pill is an American comedy film that starred Aaron Kuban, Adam Carr, Rosie Tisch, Gerold Wunstel, Trevor Coppola, Jonathan Ahdout, Ashley Whittaker and Chacko Vadaketh.

Plot
Stephen played by Aaron Kubanis accidentally takes two erectile dysfunction pills and has various troublesome situations and misadventures. Thinking he's taken pills for a headache, he becomes more and more aroused every time he sees a woman or when one comes near him. During the course of his mis-adventure he ends up at the hospital, a jail, a retirement home, and a brothel. There's even a subplot of sorts involving a corrupt drug company and an obsessed German scientist Johan Von Luther played by Gerold Wunstel.

Production
This was the debut film from director Aaron Godfred and made on a low budget. In August 2008, director/ writer Godfred started off writing the script for the film as a short but eventually it went out to 37 pages which was way to long to keep the film as a short. Most of the leads for the film came from LAcasting.com. The film was shot in July 2009 and done over 4 six-day weeks By the middle of August that year they had completed a rough cut. In around 10 months the film was completed. The film's premiere was held at the Hollywood Theatre in Portland on Saturday March 26 at 9 pm.

Cast

 Jonathan Ahdout  ... Dr. Hrundi Bhatnagar 
 Chacko Vadaketh ... Commercial Director 
 Maren McGuire ...  Bar Wench 
 Amber Chase  ... Adult Star 
 Jessica Salazar ...  Daughter 
 Gerold Wunstel ... Dr. Johan Von Luther 
 Aaron Kuban ...  Stephen 
 Ava Ellen Stephan ...  Phalitech Employee 
 Catherine Johnson ...  Jasmine 
 Rich Cashin ... Ripped Aryan 
 Trevor Coppola ...  John Kilter 
 Adam Carr ...  Oscar 
 Harvey Kalan ...  Commercial Husband 
 Malice  ... Tammy 
 Jeff Gorham ...  Evan Swartzberg 
 Deb Kalan ...  Commercial Wife 
 Rosie Tisch ...  Lane 
 Krista Nicoli ...  Party Girl
 Kristin Coleman ...  Maggie Cohen 
 Mary Nelson ...  High School Girl #2 
 Robert Burton ...  Shane 
 Cesar Salazar ...  Father 
 Kareem Hill ...  Spencer Nair 
 Mark Franklin ...  Murderer 
 Robert J. Olin Plainclothes Cop 
 
 Ellen Bloodworth ...  Dolores 
 Angela Hahn ...  Frances 
 Jeremiah Benjamin ... Test Subject #8 
 Stephanie Blair ...  Miriam Schwartzberg 
 Kate Anderson ...  Amanda 
 Teresa Decher ...  High School Girl #1 
 Brenan Dwyer ..  Lanna 
 Steve Koeppen ... Lewd Wino 
 Donna Scholars  ... Darlene
 Frankie Fronk  ... Test Subject #4 
 Harold Phillips ... Detective 
 Jake Rossman  ... Prison Guard 
 Michael Rouches ...  Police Seargent 
 Frank Woodman ... Larry Cohen 
 Teresa Lawrence ...  Elle Bentley 
 Ashley Whittaker ...  Dr. Jana Ondeck 
 Jessica Burbank ... Marla 
 Akbar Kedear ...  Ginno 
 Jenny Fink ...  Irate Mother 
 Anne Sheridan Kennedy ...  Laboratory Scientist 
 Jennifer Ahlbom ...  Bomb Girl 
 Matt Stockalper ...  Hans 
 Matthew Sa  ... Jason Deniel 
 Michael E. Thomas ...  Angry Neighbor 
  Noraa Derfdog ... Irate Truck Driver

Links
 Little Blue Pill The Movie
 Little Blue Pill at Imdb

References

Films shot in Oregon
2010 comedy films
American comedy films